A big rig or semi-trailer truck is an articulated vehicle that consists of a towing engine.

Big Rig may refer to:
 Big Rigs: Over the Road Racing, a 2003 video game
 Big Rig (film), a 2008 documentary film
 Big Rig (band), a band
 Ron "Big Rig" Michaels, a disc jockey at WXTB in Tampa

See also
 Johny Hendricks, American mixed martial artist known as Bigg Rigg